Ponç or Ponc may refer to:

Ponç de la Guàrdia (1154–1188), Catalan knight of the family of Saguàrdia, lords of the castle of Ripoll
Ponç d'Ortafà (c. 1170–1246), Catalan nobleman and troubadour
Ponç Guerau (floruit 1105–1162), Catalan nobleman
Ponç Hug IV, Count of Empúries (1264–1313), the Count of Empúries (Ampurias) from 1277 until his death and viscount of Bas from 1285 to 1291
PONC, a strand on Cúla 4 targeting 12- to 18-year-olds
ponc séimhithe, the Dot (diacritic) in Irish typography

See also
Ponk, green immature sorghum grains
Ponque, the Colombian version of pound cake
Ponce, surname of Basque origin
Ponca, Native American people